Myopia is Tom Fogerty's fourth solo album. It was released by Fantasy Records in 1974. The cover painting is called "One Beat of Dove's Wing" by Paul Whitehead.

Track listing
All songs written by Tom Fogerty.
 "Give Me Another Trojan Song" – 2:59
 "What Did I Know" – 2:35
 "Theme from Four-D" – 3:11
 "Sweet Things to Come" – 2:11
 "What About Tomorrow" – 4:23
 "She La La La" –  3:01
 "And I Love You" –  2:23
 "Get Up" –  2:07
 "There Was a Time" – 3:09
 "Show Down" – 2:35

Personnel
 Doug Clifford – percussion, drums
 Stu Cook – bass
 Russell DaShiell – guitar
 Tom Fogerty – guitar, vocals
 Russ Gary – guitar, vocals
 Stephen Miller – keyboards
 Tom Phillips – guitar
 Stovall Sisters – vocals

References

1974 albums
Tom Fogerty albums
Fantasy Records albums